Maraq (also, Mairik and Marak) is a village in the Goygol Rayon of Azerbaijan.

References 

Populated places in Goygol District